The Capture of the French Folly Fort by British forces in China occurred on 6 November 1856 during the Second Opium War. The British dispersed 23 Chinese war junks and captured the French Folly fort in the Pearl River near the city of Canton (Guangzhou) in Guangdong province. The battle lasted nearly an hour. The British consul Harry Parkes described the Chinese as putting up "a very hot resistance" and the engagement as "exceeding creditable to the bravery not only of our men, but of the Chinese also."

Gallery

Citations and references
Citations

References
Bulletins and Other State Intelligence for the Year 1857. Part 1. London: Harrison and Sons. 1859.
Papers Relating to the Proceedings of Her Majesty's Naval Forces at Canton. London: Harrison and Sons. 1857.

1856 in China
French Folly Fort
French Folly Fort
Military history of Guangdong
French Folly Fort
November 1856 events